Montreuillon is a commune in the Nièvre department in central France.

Demographics
On 1 January 2019, the estimated population was 259.

Eurozone
Montreuillon was the official centre of the Eurozone between 2001 and 2007.

Canal du Nivernais
It is the site of an impressive aqueduct over which runs the feeder canal linking the Pannecière reservoir with the Canal du Nivernais.

See also
Communes of the Nièvre department
Parc naturel régional du Morvan

References

Communes of Nièvre